Kim Seong-hun is a Korean name consisting of the family name Kim and the given name Seong-hun, and may also refer to:

 Kim Sung-hoon (biologist) (born 1958), South Korean biologist
 Kim Seong-hun (filmmaker) (born 1971), South Korean filmmaker
 Kim Sung-hoon (director) (born 1974), South Korean film director
 Sung-hoon Kim (born 1978), South Korean pianist
 Kim Sung-hun (politician), a North Korean politician
 Kim Sung-hoon, birth name of the actor Ha Jung-woo